André Andersen (born 16 December 1961) is a Russian-born multi-instrumentalist and composer best known as the keyboardist and founder of the Denmark-based progressive metal band Royal Hunt. André started his "music life" at very young age and went the whole circle through studio sessions, live performances and literally anything in between, establishing a remarkable carrier which is still evolving, bringing him to every aspect, every corner of music industry.

Discography

Solo albums
 Changing Skin (1997)
 Black on Black (2001)
 OceanView (2003)
 Andersen / Laine / Readman - III (Three) (2006)

EPs
 1000 Miles Away (1997)
 In the Late Hour (1998)

Royal Hunt
 Land of Broken Hearts (1992)
 The Maxi Single - EP (1992)
 Clown in the Mirror (1993)
 Far Away - EP (1994)
 Moving Target (1995)
 1996 (Live Double Album) (1996)
 Paradox - (1997)
 Closing the Chapter - Live Album (1998)
 Fear (1999)
 Intervention - EP (2000)
 The Mission (2001)
 The Watchers (2002)
 Eyewitness (2003)
 Paper Blood (2005)
 2006 (Live Double Album) (2006)
 Collision Course: Paradox II (2008)
 X (Ten) (2010)
 Show Me How To Live (2011)
 A Life To Die For (2013)
 Devil's Dozen (2015)
 Cargo (Live Double Album) (2016)
 2016 (Live Double Album) (2017)
 Cast in Stone (2018)
 Dystopia (2020)

Other works
 Changes - Narita (1994)
 Crash - Masahiro Chono EP (1995)
 Life - Narita (1996)
 The Unknown - Prime Time (1998)
 Arrival - Cornerstone (2000)
 Wake Up - Keiji Mutoh EP
 Earthmaker - John West (2002)
 BattleCity - Wood Bell Corporation (2002)
 Once Upon Our Yesterdays - Cornerstone (2003)
 Welcome to the Show - Evil Masquerade (2004)
 Theatrical Madness - Evil Masquerade (2005)
 No Compromises - Peter Brander (2010)
 Unlimited Edition - Eclipse Hunter (2011)
 Pictures From A Time Traveller - Marcus Jidell (2013)
 II - Seven Thorns (2014)
 Staring Down The Barrel - N'Tribe (Single) (2018)
 Root'n'Branch - N-Tribe (EP)  (2019)

References

External links
 André Andersen Official Homepage
 
 
 Royal Hunt Official Homepage
 NorthPoint Productions Official Homepage

1961 births
Living people
Danish heavy metal musicians
Musicians from Moscow
Danish people of Georgian descent
Royal Hunt members